The Super Stocks were a California studio band created by Gary Usher in 1964 to capitalize on the popularity of surf music and hot rods. Usher's bands distinguished themselves from other studio creations by the quality of the session musicians – the Super Stocks made use of Wrecking Crew session musicians, including guitarist Glen Campbell. The band produced three albums on Capitol.

Discography
School Is a Drag (1964, Capitol)
Surf Route 101 (1964, Capitol) 
Thunder Road (1964, Capitol)

References

Surf music groups